Noordwelle is a village in the Dutch province of Zeeland. It is a part of the municipality of Schouwen-Duiveland, and lies about 5 km southwest of Scharendijke.

The village was first mentioned in 1109 as Willa, and means well. Noord (north) has been added to distinguish from the former village Zuidwelle. Noordwelle is a circular village around a church which is surrounded by moat. It developed near a 13th century castle which was lost in a flood in the 15th or 16th century. In 1575, Noordwelle was in Spanish hands and liberated by the Dutch States Army on 14 January 1576.

The Dutch Reformed church is a single-aisled church. The tower dates from around 1450. The church was destroyed by war in 1576, and rebuilt slightly bigger in the 17th century. The choir was converted into a school in 1859. In the early 1960s, the school parts were demolished.

Noordwelle was home to 392 people in 1840. It was a separate municipality until 1961, when it was merged with Westerschouwen. In 1997, it became part of the municipality of Schouwen-Duiveland.

Gallery

References

Schouwen-Duiveland
History of Schouwen-Duiveland
Populated places in Zeeland
Former municipalities of Zeeland